The 2nd Army Brigade is a mixed (mechanized infantry and armoured) brigade of the Serbian Army.

History 
The brigade was formed on March 28, 2007, from the former Army units located in western Serbia: 252nd Armoured Brigade, 37th Motorized Brigade, 20th Motorized Brigade, 401st Air Defence Artillery Brigade as well as parts of 228th Signal Battalion, 524th Logistics Base and 24th Special Purpose Battalion.

Structure
Brigade's units are spread out throughout western and central Serbia, from the border with Montenegro on south to Drina and Velika Morava rivers on west and east, to area around city of Valjevo on north. It consists of mechanized infantry, armoured, artillery, air defence artillery, engineer, signal and logistics units.
 20th Command Battalion - Kraljevo
 21st Infantry Battalion - Raška
 22nd Infantry Battalion - Požega
 23rd Self-propelled Artillery Battalion - Kraljevo
 24th Self-propelled Missile Launcher Artillery Battalion - Valjevo
 25th Air-defence Artillery Battalion - Kraljevo
 26th Tank Battalion - Kraljevo
 27th Mechanized Battalion - Kraljevo
 28th Mechanized Battalion - Novi Pazar
 29th Logistics Battalion - Kraljevo 
 210th Engineer Battalion - Kraljevo

Equipment
M-84 main battle tank
BVP M-80 infantry fighting vehicle
BRDM-2 armoured reconnaissance vehicle
2S1 Gvozdika 122mm self-propelled howitzer
M-94 Plamen-S 128mm self-propelled multiple rocket launcher
Strela 1 short-range surface-to-air missile system
Bofors L/70 anti-aircraft gun
engineer and logistic vehicles and equipment

Traditions

Anniversary
The anniversary of the brigade is celebrated on July 12. On that day in 1805, during the First Serbian Uprising, in the Battle of Karanovac, town of 
Kraljevo and its surroundings was liberated from Ottoman Empire.

Patron saint
The unit's slava or its patron saint is Feast of Saints Peter and Paul known as Petrovdan.

References

External links
2nd Army Brigade Web Page

Brigades of Serbia
Military units and formations established in 2007